Sir Arthur Llewellyn Armitage  (1 August 1916 – 1 February 1984), was a British academic who was the President of Queens' College, Cambridge, from 1958 until 1970, Vice-Chancellor of Cambridge University between 1965–67 and Vice-Chancellor of Victoria University of Manchester between 1969 and 1980.

Born in Marsden, West Yorkshire, Armitage was educated at Hulme Grammar School and in 1933 went to Queens' College, Cambridge, where he gained a first class degree in Law. After he spent two years at Yale on a Commonwealth Fund Fellowship and was called to the Bar in Inner Temple 1940. He served for five years in the Army during the Second World War, achieving the rank of Major.

He became a Fellow and tutor of the college in 1947. He was elected President of Queens' in 1958 upon the death of John Archibald Venn. In 1969 he was appointed Vice-Chancellor of Victoria University of Manchester, the appointment caused student protests at the time, with over 3000 students occupying the main university building in protest over the lack of consultation on the appointment. He later served as Chairman of the Committee of Vice-Chancellors.

In his later years, Armitage chaired a series of government committees under James Callaghan and Margaret Thatcher, including the Social Security Advisory Committee; the Armitage Committee, set up to review the rules governing the political activities of civil servants; and an independent inquiry into lorries and their effect on people and the environment.

Armitage was President of Cambridge University Cricket Club between 1965 and 1970.

He was knighted in the 1975 New Year Honours List.

References

 "Obituaries: Sir Arthur Armitage",  The Times (London, England), Monday, Feb 06, 1984; pg. 16

1916 births
1984 deaths
Military personnel from Yorkshire
Knights Bachelor
Alumni of Queens' College, Cambridge
Fellows of Queens' College, Cambridge
Presidents of Queens' College, Cambridge
Members of the Inner Temple
Vice-Chancellors of the Victoria University of Manchester
Vice-Chancellors of the University of Cambridge
20th-century British lawyers
British Army personnel of World War II
British Army officers